The 1890 Quebec general election was held on June 17, 1890, to elect members of the 7th Legislative Assembly of the Province of Quebec, Canada.  The incumbent Quebec Liberal Party Parti national coalition led by Honoré Mercier, was re-elected, defeating the Quebec Conservative Party, led by Louis-Olivier Taillon.

A scandal and charges of corruption cut short Mercier's term of office.  He was later cleared of all charges, but his political career was ended.

Redistribution of ridings
Through the passage of two Acts passed prior to the election, the Assembly was increased from 65 to 73 members through the following changes:

Results

See also
 List of Quebec premiers
 Politics of Quebec
 Timeline of Quebec history
 List of Quebec political parties
 7th Legislative Assembly of Quebec

References

Quebec general election
Elections in Quebec
General election
Quebec general election